Larry Mantle (born January 12, 1959) is a radio interview call-in show host in Southern California.  He has been the host of AirTalk with Larry Mantle on NPR-member station KPCC, 89.3 FM, since April 1, 1985. AirTalk is the longest-running daily talk show in Southern California.  AirTalk has served as KPCC's flagship program for most of its tenure, and Mantle has received many awards for his journalism, including the Society of Professional Journalists Radio Journalist of the Year award and the Associated Press' prestigious Mark Twain award.

Fridays at 11:00 a.m., Mantle hosts the movie review and interview program FilmWeek on AirTalk. He was also the program director of KPCC in the 1990s, before it came under the umbrella of American Public Media.  Mantle was one of the champions of the KPCC-APM merger that created Southern California Public Radio.

Personal
Mantle grew up in Inglewood and Hollywood, California, and is a graduate of Hollywood High School. He has a B.A. in psychology from Vanguard University in Costa Mesa, California. Mantle is married to Speech-Language Pathologist Kristen Mantle (née Hernandez). They have a teenage son, Desmond.  Mantle is also a Christian.

References

External links
Larry Mantle at KPPC.org
Scpr.org

American public radio personalities
Journalists from California
Radio personalities from Los Angeles
1959 births
Living people
People from Hollywood, Los Angeles
20th-century American journalists
American male journalists